KELT-9b is an exoplanet—more specifically, an ultra-hot Jupiter—that orbits the late B-type/early A-type star KELT-9, located about 670 light-years from Earth. Detected using the Kilodegree Extremely Little Telescope, the discovery of KELT-9b was announced in 2016. , it is the hottest known exoplanet.

Host star 
The star is 2-3 times bigger and 2–5 times more massive than the sun. The surface temperature of the host star, KELT-9, is 10,170 K, unusually hot for a star with a transiting planet. Prior to the discovery of KELT-9b, only six A-type stars were known to have planets, of which the warmest, WASP-33, is significantly cooler at 7,430 K; no B-type stars were previously known to host planets. KELT-9, classified as  B9.5-A0 could be the first B-type star known to have a planet. KELT-9b occupies a circular but strongly inclined orbit a mere 0.03462 AU from KELT-9 with an orbital period of less than 1.5 days.

Physical properties 

KELT-9b is a relatively large giant planet at about 2.8 times the mass of Jupiter; however, given that its radius is nearly twice that of Jupiter, its density is less than half that of Jupiter. Like many hot Jupiters, KELT-9b is tidally locked with its host star.
The outer boundary of its atmosphere nearly reaches its Roche lobe, implying that the planet is experiencing rapid atmospheric escape driven by the extreme amount of radiation it receives from its host star. In 2020, atmospheric loss rate was measured to be equal to 18 - 68 Earth masses per billion years.

The planet elemental abundances remains largely unconstrained as in 2022, but low carbon-to-oxygen ratio is strongly suspected.

, KELT-9b is the hottest known exoplanet, with dayside temperatures approaching 4,600 K — warmer than many low-mass stars. Molecules on the day side are broken into their component atoms, so that normally sequestered refractory elements can exist as atomic species, including neutral oxygen, neutral and singly ionized atomic iron (Fe and Fe+) and singly ionized titanium (Ti+), only to temporarily reform once they reach the cooler night side, which is indirectly confirmed by measured enhanced heat transfer efficiency of 0.3 between dayside and nightside, likely diven by the latent heat of dissociation and recombination of the molecular hydrogen. Surprisingly, spectra taken in 2021 have unambiguously indicated a presence of metal oxides and hydrides in the planetary atmosphere, although higher resolution spectra taken in 2021 have not found any molecular emissions from the planetary dayside.

The thermosphere layer of KELT-9b is expected to heat up to 10,000-11,000 K, driven by ionization of heavy metals atoms like iron.

See also 
Gliese 3470 b

References

External links

 SIMBAD entry for HD 195689

Cygnus (constellation)
Transiting exoplanets
Exoplanets discovered in 2016
Exoplanets discovered by KELT
Hot Jupiters